The statue of Héctor Azar is installed in the city of Puebla's historic centre, in the Mexican state of Puebla.

External links

 

Monuments and memorials in Puebla
Outdoor sculptures in Puebla (city)
Sculptures of men in Mexico
Statues in Puebla
Historic centre of Puebla